Colors Gujarati (formerly known as ETV Gujarati) is an Indian television channel that primarily broadcasts Gujarati entertainment shows.

History
Based in Ahmedabad, it was started by Prism TV Pvt. Ltd. It is now part of Viacom18 and TV18 which are owned by Network18 Group.  ETV Gujarati was re-branded under the Colors franchise on 20 April 2015. Colors Gujarati initiated the BIG Gujarati Entertainment Awards for excellence in the world of Gujarati entertainment and also telecasts Gujarati films.

Current broadcast

Drama series

Dubbed series

Reality

Former broadcast

Drama

Dubbed shows
Mahavir Hanuman
Naagin
Jai Shri Krishna
Ganpati Bappa Morya
Karmaphal Daata Shani

Reality shows
Naach Maari Saathe 
Khadkhadat
Daily Bonus
Sudi Vachche Sopari
Bolo Ketla Taka

References

External links
Official Site

Television stations in Ahmedabad
Gujarati-language television
Gujarati-language television channels in India
Television channels and stations established in 2002
Communications in Gujarat
ETV Network
Viacom 18
2002 establishments in Gujarat